The Rt Rev Colonel Peter Simiyu has been the  Bishop of the Anglican Episcopate of the Kenyan Armed Forces since 2009.

Notes

21st-century Anglican bishops of the Anglican Church of Kenya
Anglican bishops of the Kenyan Armed Forces
Kenya
2009 establishments in Kenya